Botond Molnár (born 3 September 2004) is a Hungarian artistic gymnast. He is the  2022 European  Junior All-Around Champion.

Career 
In 2020 Molnár competed at the  2020 European Junior Championships in Mersin as part of the Hungarian Team which won silver. Individually he also won the bronze medal on floor.

In 2022 at the  2022 European Junior Championships held in Munich, Germany, Molnár became the Junior All-Around Champion  and he won bronze on vault.

Competitive history

References

External links 

 
 

Living people
2004 births
Hungarian male artistic gymnasts
Gymnasts from Budapest
21st-century Hungarian people